The Joint Forward Air Controller Training and Standards Unit (JFACTSU) is a training unit located at RAF Leeming in North Yorkshire, England. The unit teaches students from across all three services of the United Kingdom's Armed Forces (and international allies) about Forward Air Control (FAC) including laser designation of targets. Forward Air Controllers working from a forward position on the ground or in the air, direct the action of combat aircraft engaged in close air support of land forces.

History
During the First World War, troops on the ground would use flares, ground markers and flags to guide pilots in on targets. The difficulties in actual communication between the air and the ground meant that real time information was lost. By the time of the Africa Campaign in 1941, man portable radios were available for troops on the ground to brief aircrew. This lead in turn to the establishment of Forward Air Support Links (FASL) (or Rover Parties) which involved soldiers and Airmen of RAF Desert Air Force.

After the Second World War, the lessons learned were taken forward into the Air Land Integration policy of the School of Land-Air Warfare (SLAW) which taught formal FAC training at RAF Old Sarum in Wiltshire. When flying ceased at RAF Old Sarum, the FAC training moved on as part of the Joint Warfare Establishment firstly to RAF Chivenor then to RAF Brawdy.

When RAF Brawdy was decommissioned as an RAF base and handed over to the army, JFACTSU moved to RAF Finningley in South Yorkshire. Finningley then closed just two years later and in 1995, JFACTSU moved to its present location at RAF Leeming in North Yorkshire.

British Forward Air Controllers have been deployed into many conflicts and operations such as Korea, Malaya, Suez, Indonesia, Aden, Oman, Falklands, Operation Granby, Operation Agricola, Operation Telic and Operation Herrick.

Training

JFACTSU have two Hawk aircraft and two pilots on their staff who are overseen in flying matters by 100 Squadron at the adjacent hangar on RAF Leeming in North Yorkshire. Students on the course are taught how to request, plan, brief and execute close air support operations and subject to medical status, students are also able to fly back seat in one of the Hawk aircraft to experience first hand what the pilot will be seeing and hearing. The four to eight week course (depending on the specialization and security restrictions) culminates in a training exercise held at RAF Spadeadam in Cumbria where the students call in mock attacks from the 100 Sqn Hawks. Training can also be delivered via a state of the art iCASS (Immersive Close Air Support Simulator) that was purchased for JFACTSU in 2014.

Forward Air Controller Training can also be conducted at Pembrey Sands Range in Pembrokeshire, South Wales. This range is open to all UK and NATO allied forces.

It is noted as being a centre for FAC training and has in the past trained students from Canada, the Czech Republic, Denmark, Hungary, Malaysia, New Zealand, Norway, Poland, Slovak Republic, Sweden, The Netherlands and the United States. Many of these were trained as NATO allies and some (Czech republic, Hungary and Poland) were trained before they became NATO partners and allies. Prince Harry is among the British graduates of training courses conducted by the JFACTSU.

After training, RAF personnel (mostly from the RAF Regiment) operate from a central pool at RAF Honington in Suffolk.

Aircraft
Since its inception, JFACTSU have utilized only two types of airframe; Hawker Hunters of 229 Operational Conversion Unit (OCU) at Chivenor and Brawdy and BAe Hawks from 100 Squadron at Finningley and Leeming.

Notes

References

Sources

Education in North Yorkshire
Hambleton District
Joint military units and formations of the United Kingdom
Military history of North Yorkshire
Organisations based in North Yorkshire